{{Infobox settlement
|name                     = Mentone, Texas
|official_name            = 
|settlement_type          = Census-designated place
|nickname                 = 
|motto                    =

|image_skyline            = Mentone Courthouse.JPG
|imagesize                = 
|image_caption            = Loving County Courthouse, the only two-story building in Mentone, is listed in the National Register of Historic Places
|image_flag               = 
|image_seal               =

|pushpin_map              = Texas#USA
|pushpin_label            = Mentone
|pushpin_label_position   = 
|pushpin_map_caption      = Location in Texas##Location in the United States
|pushpin_mapsize          =
|image_map                = 
|map_caption              = 
|image_map1               = 
|mapsize1                 = 
|map_caption1             =

|subdivision_type         = Country
|subdivision_name         = United States
|subdivision_type1        = State
|subdivision_name1        = Texas
|subdivision_type2        = County
|subdivision_name2        = Loving
|government_footnotes     = 
|government_type          = 
|leader_title             = 
|leader_name              =
|leader_title1            = 
|leader_name1             = 
|established_title        = Founded
|established_date         = 1931

|unit_pref                = Imperial
|area_footnotes           = 
|area_magnitude           = 
|area_total_km2           = 0.44
|area_land_km2            = 0.44
|area_water_km2           = 0.0

|population_as_of         = 2020
|population_footnotes     = |population_total         = 22
|population_density_km2   = 50

|timezone                 = Central (CST)
|utc_offset               = -6
|timezone_DST             = CDT
|utc_offset_DST           = -5
|elevation_footnotes      = 
|elevation_ft             = 2684
|coordinates              = 

|postal_code_type         = ZIP code
|postal_code              = 79754
|area_code                = 432
|blank_name               = FIPS code
|blank_info               = 48-47676
|blank1_name              = GNIS feature ID
|blank1_info              = 1362622
|website                  = 
|footnotes                = 
}}Mentone' is an unincorporated small town in, and the county seat of, Loving County, Texas, United States. It had a population of 19 in 2010, almost a quarter of the county's 82 people at the time. 

Mentone was, until recent years, the least-populated unincorporated county seat in the United States, but lost that distinction with the 2010 census to Gann Valley, South Dakota, which had a population of 14. Mentone was designated a Recorded Texas Historic Landmark in 1967 as the "Smallest County Seat in Texas".

History
Named after Menton, France, by a French surveyor, present-day Mentone is actually the second such named community in Loving County; an earlier Mentone was founded south of the current town in 1893, but was abandoned in 1905. A second town on that site was called Juanita and then Porterville, but was deserted anew when Mentone was re-established in 1931, with most residents moving to the new town.  The town on the current site was named Ramsey before being renamed. During its heyday, Mentone boasted five cafes, five gas stations, two hotels, two drugstores, two recreation halls, two barbershops, a dance hall, a machine shop, and a dry cleaner. It also had its own newspaper, the Mentone Monitor, which published from 1932 to 1935. After reaching a high population mark around 600 residents in the 1930s, the population has declined ever since, and in 2000, it had only 15 people, "more or less", according to National Geographic (the total population of Loving County itself (as of 2010) was 82.)

Today, according to National Geographic, Mentone contains a courthouse, two stop signs, a gas station, a post office, a school building (Mentone schools were closed in the 1970s and merged with nearby Wink schools, because enrollment had fallen to just two pupils), and little else. A volunteer fire department serves the town, but no hospitals or cemeteries are there, and no doctors or lawyers. Until 1988, Mentone had no potable water of its own; local wells yielded water with a high mineral content that clogged pipes and killed grass.

Mentone's tiny church (the oldest building in Loving County) is visited every Saturday by a minister from a nearby town who holds interdenominational services there.

Mentone was the home of the first elected female sheriff in Texas, Edna Reed Clayton DeWees, who was appointed to the job in January 1945, then won an election to continue in the office through 1947. She never carried a firearm, and reported only two arrests during her entire term. This is not unusual in Loving County; since the inception of the county,  fewer than 200 criminal cases have been filed in District Court. Later, DeWees returned as county and district clerk, a job she held from 1965 to 1986. In Loving County, the posts of county clerk, probate clerk, and district clerk are managed by the same official. DeWees died January 22, 2009, having survived her husbands George Clayton and Lawrence DeWees.

Free Town Project

In February 2006, Mentone became the focus of a New York Times article detailing an alleged attempt by Lawrence Pendarvis, a man convicted of 129 counts of possession of child pornography, Bobby Emory, and Don Duncan to "take over" the town and Loving County. According to the article, Pendarvis and his associates, part of the "Free Town Project", planned to buy parcels of land in the county, then move in enough of their supporters to outvote earlier residents and take control of local government.

According to a website for Pendarvis' movement, their objectives were to "Remove oppressive regulations... and stop enforcement of laws prohibiting victimless acts among consenting adults"  Additionally, the group sought "to ensure that the sheriff's office or the town police are never allowed to waste valuable town resources... to oppress our residents by the investigation or enforcement of violations of laws that punish truancy, drug trafficking, prostitution, obscenity, organ trafficking, and other victimless 'crimes'."

Although Pendarvis, Emory, and Duncan claimed to have legally bought  in Loving County in 2005, and registered to vote accordingly, the county sheriff, Billy Burt Hopper, determined that this land had been sold to a different buyer.  Misdemeanor charges were filed against the three men, who had left the state by this time.  Pendarvis claimed to have a cancelled check to prove his purchase of the land in question, but no deed was ever produced, and the original landowners denied having sold land to Pendarvis or his associates.  The three were subsequently featured on a "wanted" poster issued by Sheriff Hopper and the local Texas Rangers (displayed at Hopper's office), and threatened with arrest should they return to Loving County.

As of 2017, Pendarvis' website is no longer operational.

Geography

Demographics

2020 censusNote: Since 2020, Mentone has been included in the Mentone, Texas, CDP, a census-designated place delineated by the United States Census Bureau for its purposes in compiling, storing and analyzing census data. Because of this, demographics taken from this census apply to the entire CDP and not just the town proper.Note Also: the US Census treats Hispanic/Latino as an ethnic category. This table excludes Latinos from the racial categories and assigns them to a separate category. Hispanics/Latinos can be of any race.'' 

As of the 2020 United States census, there were 22 people, 7 households, and 3 families residing in the CDP.

Climate 
Mentone experiences an arid desert climate with hot summers and cool winters. Due to Mentone's aridity, the diurnal temperature variation is substantial, and helps lower nighttime temperatures. Most precipitation falls in the summer and early fall.

Education
Mentone is served by the Wink-Loving Independent School District. Loving County's school system was closed and consolidated into Wink's ISD in 1972 because the enrollment had fallen to two students.
All of Loving County is zoned to Odessa College.

See also
Loving County Courthouse

References

External links

 Mentone from MyWestTexas.com Brief but detailed report on life in Mentone and Loving County.  Includes several videos of Mentone and interviews with the local sheriff and judge.
 National Geographic profile Includes a few photos of Mentone buildings and people.
 Loving County at Davickservices.com Numerous photos and stories about Mentone.  One story gives details about the smoking & credit card policies of Mentone's cafe.  A small picture of the "wanted" poster for Mssrs. Pendarvis, Emory and Duncan may also be seen here.
 Mentone, TX at texasescapes.com  More photos of Mentone buildings.
 Odessa American Includes details on Edna Dewees, first elected female sheriff in Texas.
 
 The Free Town Project Website for Lawrence Pendarvis' "Free Town Project."  Contains the material quoted above.

County seats in Texas
Recorded Texas Historic Landmarks
Populated places established in 1931
1931 establishments in Texas
Census-designated places in Texas
Census-designated places in Loving County, Texas